Božič Vrh is a small settlement in the Municipality of Metlika in the White Carniola area of southeastern Slovenia. The entire area is part of the traditional region of Lower Carniola and is now included in the Southeast Slovenia Statistical Region.

Name
Božič Vrh was attested in written sources as Woschitschen perg and Woschytzenperg in 1477.

References

External links
Božič Vrh on Geopedia

Populated places in the Municipality of Metlika